Shawn Sawyer (born January 14, 1985 in Edmundston, New Brunswick) is a Canadian former competitive figure skater. He is the 2011 Canadian national silver medallist and a three-time (2005-2006 & 2008) Canadian national bronze medallist. He represented Canada in the 2006 Winter Olympics in Turin, Italy finishing 12th overall. Unlike most skaters, Sawyer is a clockwise spinner.

Personal life 
Shawn Sawyer was born in Edmundston, New Brunswick.

Career

Early career 
He started skating at age nine. Even as a young skater, he was known for his artistry and his spirals. This attracted the attention of Olympic bronze medallist Toller Cranston. Cranston was about to retire from show skating and he envisioned a final tribute show in which he and other skaters passed down their knowledge of skating and life lessons to a young skater. This skater was Shawn Sawyer. Cranston remains a mentor to Sawyer.

In 1999, Sawyer won the bronze medal on the novice level at the Canada Winter Games, skating with a bad cold. The following year, he won the national novice title. He skated on the Junior Grand Prix the following season and won the bronze medal at his first event. His fifth-place finish at his second event prevented him from qualifying for the JGP Final. At Nationals, he placed 4th in the junior level. On the JGP the following season, he qualified for the Junior Grand Prix Final, where he placed fifth, and then won the national Junior title. This earned him a trip to the 2002 Junior Worlds, where he placed 11th after performing an entirely new long program.

Sawyer, already very flexible, had been working on a Biellmann spin. As a junior skater, Sawyer trained at the Minto Skating Club in Ottawa under coach Alexei Tchetveroukin. He had been training the Biellmann since learning in New Brunswick at age twelve, and he performed it in exhibition at Nationals in 2002 after winning the junior title.

Later, Sawyer changed coaches to Gordon Forbes. In his third season as a junior internationally, he won his second JGP event, but an 8th-place finish prevented him from returning to the Final. In his senior debut at Nationals, he placed 6th, a promising finish, and then repeated that placement at the World Junior Championships.

The 2003-2004 season would be Sawyer's last as a junior. He dropped to ninth place at nationals and tenth at Junior Worlds. Sawyer then went senior internationally. Following this season, he changed coaches to Annie Barabe and Sophie Richard and moved to Drummondville, Quebec.

Senior career 

At the 2004 Cup of Russia, Sawyer's first senior international event, he placed just off the podium. He placed ninth at the 2004 NHK Trophy. At nationals, he won the bronze medal, earning him a trip to the 2005 Four Continents. His podium finish did not earn him a spot to Worlds because Canada had only two spots to the 2005 World Championships.

In the 2005-2006 season, the Olympic season, Sawyer placed in the middle of the fields in his two Grand Prix events. But he held on to the bronze position at Nationals, earning him a spot to the Olympics and to Worlds. He placed 12th at the Olympics and 21st at Worlds, held in Calgary.

In the 2006-2007 season, Sawyer placed just off the podium at the Skate Canada competition. Sawyer then placed 8th at the Grand Prix event in Paris. At Nationals, he was ahead after the short program, but a charismatic comeback performance by Emanuel Sandhu pushed Sawyer down to 4th, depriving him of a spot to Four Continents and Worlds.

In the 2007-2008 season, Sawyer placed 7th at his first event, the 2007 Cup of China. At his second event, the 2007 NHK Trophy, he placed 9th. At the 2008 Canadian Championships, he won his third bronze medal at that competition. This earned him a trip to the 2008 Four Continents, where he placed 9th.

The 2008-2009 season started off with two back to back competitions for Sawyer. He opened the season at 2008 Skate America where he placed fifth and then continued to 2008 Skate Canada International where he again placed fifth. Even though his overall placement was fifth, he did win the free skate with a score of 142.36.

In 2009-2010, Sawyer was awarded the silver medal at Skate America, but placed fourth at Canadian Nationals, narrowly missing a trip to the 2010 Olympic Games by two spots.

In 2010-2011, he won the silver at the 2011 Canadian Championships and was named to the team for the World Championships. After the Japan earthquake, the event was postponed by a month and now coincided with his commitment to Stars on Ice. Sawyer decided to withdraw from the World Championships and was replaced by Kevin Reynolds. He decided to end his competitive career. He continued to perform in ice shows, such as Art on Ice.

Signature moves 

Sawyer is well known for his spins and his spiral positions, which show great flexibility. Sawyer is one of few male skaters to perform spirals in their programs, because under Code of Points, men do not get any credit for spiral sequences. Sawyer's arabesque, I and Y positions in spins and spirals are his trademark moves.

Programs

Competitive highlights 
GP: Grand Prix; JGP: Junior Grand Prix

References

External links 

 
 Skate Canada Profile

1985 births
Canadian male single skaters
Figure skaters at the 2006 Winter Olympics
Living people
Sportspeople from New Brunswick
Olympic figure skaters of Canada
People from Edmundston